Washington Initiative 732 (I-732) was a ballot initiative in 2016 to levy a carbon tax in the State of Washington, and simultaneously reduce the state sales tax. It was rejected 59.3% to 40.7%. The measure appeared on the November 2016 ballot. The backers of I-732 submitted roughly 350,000 signatures in December 2015 to certify the initiative.

The initiative was spearheaded by environmental economist Yoram Bauman, a strong advocate of carbon pricing. It was modeled after the British Columbia carbon tax, which was considered "popular across the political spectrum". The carbon tax in British Columbia caused the province's fuel consumption to decrease by 16% and its greenhouse gas emissions to decrease 3.5 times faster than the emissions of Canada as a whole, while maintaining steady economic growth.

Ballot measure summary
The ballot measure summary as written by the Secretary of State of Washington:

"This measure would impose a carbon emission tax on the sale or use of certain fossil fuels and fossil-fuel-generated electricity, at $15 per metric ton of carbon dioxide in 2017, and increasing gradually to $100 per metric ton (2016 dollars adjusted for inflation), with more gradual phase-in for some users. It would reduce the sales tax rate by one percentage point over two years, increase a low-income sales tax exemption, and reduce certain manufacturing taxes."

Provisions 
Initiative 732 contained four provisions:
 Creates a new tax on the carbon content of fossil fuels initially set at $15 per ton, rising to $25 per ton after 6 months, and increasing annually to a cap of $100 per ton.
 Reduces the Washington State Sales Tax 1% from 6.5% to 5.5%
 Reduces the Business and Occupation Tax on Manufacturing Businesses in Washington State to .001%
 Funds the Working Families Tax rebate program, a 25% match on the state's version of the earned income tax credit for 460,000 Washington households.

Supporting organizations 
The primary sponsor of Initiative 732 was CarbonWA, a group founded by environmental economist Yoram Bauman to promote carbon pricing. The Audubon Society was also a major proponent of Initiative 732, "Audubon Washington believes Initiative 732 provides swift and effective action to reduce carbon pollution". Other organizations that supported Initiative 732 included the Sightline Institute, and the Citizens' Climate Lobby. Other supporters include Washington State legislator Joe Fitzgibbon (D), Washington State Senator Steve Litzow (R), Washington State Senator Joe Fain (R), Washington State Senator Cyrus Habib (D), and the editorial board of The Olympian. Climate scientist James Hansen, who has been involved with the Citizens' Climate Lobby for many years, strongly supported the proposal.

The backers of initiative 732 claimed that I-732 "taxes carbon to fight climate change, boost clean energy, & save the environment for future generations".

Non-supporting organizations 
Several environmental organizations chose to make a recommendation to "not support" the measure, as opposed to "support" or "oppose", including the Sierra Club, 350.org Seattle (who originally supported the measure, and later rescinded their support), and Climate Solutions.

Common points made in their statements included concerns that the initiative would result in a budget shortfall, and concerns over how the initiative would spend carbon fee receipts, e.g., Climate Solutions stated:

Opposing organizations 
Opponents to Initiative 732 included the Washington State Labor Council, stating: "I-732 would send Washington in the wrong direction and create more damaging austerity choices", the Association of Washington Businesses, and Longview Daily News.

Several organizations opposed the measure from an "environmental justice" perspective, or with a reference to the necessary breadth of the supporting coalition, including Front and Centered (formerly: Communities of Color for Climate Justice), and the Washington Environmental Council, stating:

Aftermath 
Although I-732 failed to pass, Carbon Washington continued to work to put a price on carbon emissions in the State of Washington. They worked with others to support Washington Initiative 1631, a carbon tax measure that appeared on the ballots in 2018 but was also rejected.

See also
 Citizen's Climate Lobby
 Pigouvian tax
 , the campaign website for this measure

References

2016 Washington (state) elections
2016 in politics
2016 Washington (state) ballot measures